Brunet is a surname. Notable people with the surname include:

Andrée Brunet, figure skater
Catherine Brunet (born 1990), Canadian actress
Claude Brunet (1942–1988), campaigner for patients rights
Éric Brunet (born 1964) French political commentator and radio host
Eugène Cyrille Brunet (1828–1921), French sculptor
Frantz Brunet (1879–1965), French linguist
Gaspard Jean-Baptiste Brunet (1734-1793), commanded the French Army of Italy during the French Revolutionary Wars, father of Jean Baptiste
Genevieve Brunet (born 1959), Canadian cyclist
George Brunet (1935–1991), American baseball player
Jacques Charles Brunet (1780–1867), French bibliographer
Jean Baptiste Brunet (1763-1824), general of division in the French Revolutionary Army, son of Gaspard Jean-Baptiste
Jean Brunet (1822–1894), French poet
Jean-Pierre Brunet, figure skater
Jules Brunet (1838–1911), captain
Joseph-Émile Brunet (1878–1953), Canadian sculptor
Luíza Brunet, Brazilian model
Manuel Brunet, Argentinian field hockey player
Marta Brunet, Chilean writer
Michel Brunet (disambiguation)
Pierre Nicolas Brunet (1733–1771), French playwright
Pierre Brunet (disambiguation)
Roberta Brunet, Italian athlete
Sylvie Brunet, French mezzo-soprano
Yasmin Brunet, Brazilian model 

French-language surnames